Nicholas Louis "Nick" Bissell Jr. (January 14, 1947 – November 27, 1996) was the county prosecutor of Somerset County, New Jersey. After being charged with embezzlement, tax fraud and abuse of power, he fled to Laughlin, Nevada, and killed himself after a standoff with US Marshals.

Biography
Born in 1947 to Nicholas L. Bissell Sr. (1919–2002) and his wife, Louise,  Nick Bissell grew up in Woodbridge Township, New Jersey, and later moved to Somerville, New Jersey. He entered private practice, then worked as a part-time judge. He then became an assistant prosecutor in Somerset County, and was appointed county prosecutor in 1982 by Governor Tom Kean. He held that position for 13 years. His specialty was civil forfeiture. At one point, the value of the assets he seized were the highest in the state, even though Somerset County is the eighth-smallest county in New Jersey. One of his best-known cases that didn't involve a forfeiture was the prosecution of Matthew Heikkila, a 21-year-old from affluent Basking Ridge, who, on January 29, 1991, murdered his adoptive parents. Although Bissell pressed for the death penalty, the jury sentenced Heikkila to two consecutive life sentences.

In 1990, a forfeiture case proved to be Bissell's downfall. On May 10, 1990, James Giuffre was arrested on charges of selling $700 worth of cocaine. Bissell said he would drop the charges if Giuffre forfeited two plots of land to the prosecutor's office, valued at $174,000. They were sold at auction below their appraised value to a friend of Bissell's chief of detectives. Giuffre filed a civil suit against Bissell (which the Somerset County Freeholders later settled for $435,000) and also then contacted the Internal Revenue Service and the FBI.  Forensic accountants with the IRS discovered that Bissell skimmed cash from a gas station of which he was part owner. The FBI discovered that Bissell had destroyed a suspect's written request for a lawyer and threatened to frame his gasoline wholesaler for cocaine possession.

In September 1995, Bissell was indicted on 30 federal charges of mail fraud, tax evasion and abuse of power, and was promptly fired by Governor and Somerset County resident Christine Todd Whitman.  In May 1996, he was convicted on all charges and faced a minimum sentence of six to eight years in federal prison and a maximum of ten years.  He was released under the condition that he wear an electronic bracelet until he was sentenced.  He abruptly cut it off on November 18, 1996 and fled to Nevada, leaving a note in which he stated that he intended to commit suicide. He was tracked by his cell phone.

He fatally shot himself after a 10-minute standoff in his hotel room, while members of the United States Marshals Service tried to lure him out of his room.

References

External links
 Profile (November 21, 1995), philly.com; accessed October 13, 2016.
 Profile (October 8, 1995), philly.com; accessed October 13, 2016.
  at Crime Library

1947 births
1996 suicides
District attorneys in New Jersey
Suicides by firearm in Nevada
Politicians from Somerville, New Jersey
People from Woodbridge Township, New Jersey
20th-century American politicians
Place of birth missing